Kavieng District is the northernmost district of New Ireland Province in Papua New Guinea. The district contains the northern part of the island of New Ireland, as well as New Hannover, and the St. Matthias Group.

The district headquarters is Kavieng and the district has four LLG areas, Kavieng Urban LLG, Lavongai Rural LLG, Tikana Rural LLG and Murat Rural LLG.

Districts of Papua New Guinea
New Ireland Province